Obesotoma woodiana is a species of sea snail, a marine gastropod mollusk in the family Mangeliidae.

This species was named after William Wood, an English surgeon, zoologist and entomologist

Description
The length of the shell varies between 12 mm and 17 mm.

Distribution
This species occurs in European waters and in the Northwest Atlantic Ocean off Svalbard.

References

 Moller, H.P.C (1842) Index Molluscorum Groenlandiae. Naturhistorisk Tidsskrift, (1) 4 (1) : 76–97.
 Brunel, P., L. Bosse, and G. Lamarche. 1998. Catalogue of the marine invertebrates of the estuary and Gulf of St. Lawrence. Canadian Special Publication of Fisheries and Aquatic Sciences, 126. 405 p.
 Gofas, S.; Le Renard, J.; Bouchet, P. (2001). Mollusca, in: Costello, M.J. et al. (Ed.) (2001). European register of marine species: a check-list of the marine species in Europe and a bibliography of guides to their identification. Collection Patrimoines Naturels, 50: pp. 180–213

External links
  Tucker, J.K. 2004 Catalog of recent and fossil turrids (Mollusca: Gastropoda). Zootaxa 682:1-1295.

woodiana
Gastropods described in 1842